Mágocsy is a Hungarian surname. Historically, one notable Mágocsy family were landed gentry with extensive holdings in Rusyn-inhabited Subcarpathian Rus' and neighboring territory. Alternate forms include Magocsy and Magocsi.

Individuals having this surname include:
 Paul Robert Magocsi, an American professor of history, political science, and Chair of Ukrainian Studies at the University of Toronto
 Sándor Mágócsy-Dietz, a Hungarian botanist specializing in plant physiology, dendrology, and mycology

References

Hungarian-language surnames